Ando Leps (born 6 November 1935 in Rakvere) is an Estonian politician. He was a member of the VIII Riigikogu and IX Riigikogu.

References

Living people
1935 births
Estonian jurists
Estonian Centre Party politicians
Members of the Riigikogu, 1995–1999
Members of the Riigikogu, 1999–2003
Recipients of the Order of the White Star, 5th Class
University of Tartu alumni
People from Rakvere